This is a list of flooded villages in Zeeland, a province of the Netherlands.

See also
 List of settlements lost to floods in the Netherlands

References and notes
 Extensive information can be found in the book:

References

Zeeland
 
History of Zeeland